La Reina del Sur (Eng.: Queen of the South) is the title of a studio album released by Regional Mexican band Los Tigres del Norte. This album became their third number-one hit on the Billboard Top Latin Albums chart and received a nomination for a Grammy Award for Best Mexican/Mexican-American Album.

Track listing
Adapted from Billboard.
La Reina del Sur (Teodoro Bello) – 4:04
Gavilán Perdido (Paulino Vargas) – 3:40
Con Tus Mismas Palabras (Rafael Rubio) – 3:41
Mi Soldado (Enrique Valencia) – 3:27
Mira, Mira, Mira (Enrique Negrete Rincón) – 3:35
¿En Qué Fallé? (Negrete) – 3:49
Me Regalo Contigo (Bello) – 3:06
El Artista Toscano (Manuel Eduardo Norberto) – 3:14
¿De Que Color Es la Suerte? (Vargas) – 3:32
No Merezco Tus Lagrimas (Ramón Meléndez) – 3:09
Cáusame la Muerte (Juan Meza) – 3:24
Lo Felicito Amigo (Manuel Eduardo Toscano) – 3:53
Platos de Segunda Mesa (Bello) – 2:47
El Fin del Mundo (Bello) – 3:39

Personnel
Adapted from Allmusic.
Jim Dean – Engineer
Eduardo Hernández – Arranger, art direction
Andrew Mendelson – Mastering
Joseph Pope – Assistant engineer
Raz Kennedy – Collaboration
Rafael Rubio – Collaboration
Christian Besson – Photography
Bill Hernández – Wardrobe

Chart performance

Sales and certifications

References

2002 albums
Los Tigres del Norte albums
Fonovisa Records albums